Minth University of Science and Technology (MUST) is a private university in Qionglin Township, Hsinchu County, Taiwan.

History
Introduction to :Minth University of Technology and Science
 Numbered list itemSince the establishment of the school in 1967, it was originally named Tahua University of Science and Technology. It is one of the most important technical and vocational universities in Taiwan. It has developed for 54 years and has a long history of achievement and development. The school is located near the most important science park in Taiwan. More than 60,000 alumni have made a huge contribution to Taiwan’s economic development. 
 Numbered list itemIn 2019,Mr. Qin Ronghua, the founder of Minth Group,the world top 100 automotive group,donate huge capital to university and fully promote the sustainable development of school affairs. 
 Numbered list itemIn 2021, the Ministry of Education approved the admission of students to the Smart Manufacturing Engineering Department and the Smart Vehicle and Energy Department to cultivate AI manufacturing and application talents. The school is also Renamed to: Minth University of Technology and Science to foster closer relationship with the Minth Global Group.
 Numbered list itemThe global resources of Minth Group are the strong backing for the development of the University which is dedicated to the sustainable operation and training of talents with holistic corporate values ​​and DNA.
 Numbered list itemThe school has also set out the ambition, vision and value for this transformation.
Vision:To manage an artificial intelligence professional university that is innovative, practical and employable. A forward-looking and influential first-rate university of science and technology. 
Value: With the whole-person education of "smart thinking and practical", cultivate enterprise innovative talents with forward-looking morality, humanistic quality, international vision and science and technology specialty. 
Mission :It is necessary to develop and establish a new model of enterprise education with the high-quality orientation of the Minth Group’s corporate value.

Transportation
The university is accessible East from Shangyuan Station of the Taiwan Railways.

See also
 List of universities in Taiwan

References

External links

 

1967 establishments in Taiwan
Educational institutions established in 1967
Universities and colleges in Hsinchu County
Universities and colleges in Taiwan
Technical universities and colleges in Taiwan